The 2019 Global T20 Canada was the second edition of the Global T20 Canada, a 20-over professional cricket tournament, played at the CAA Centre, Brampton, Ontario. It started on 25 July 2019, and concluded with the final on 11 August 2019. It was slightly later in the calendar than the previous tournament, to avoid clashing with the 2019 Cricket World Cup. Vancouver Knights are the defending champions. A new team named New York Legends were announced to replace Cricket West Indies B Team. However, the idea was later cancelled, and the Brampton Wolves were named as the sixth franchise team in June 2019.

On 26 July 2019, the start of the match between Montreal Tigers and Winnipeg Hawks was delayed by 90 minutes due to a bomb threat, when a suspicious package was found in the venue. The package was removed, with the match being reduced to twelve overs per side.

The final, between the Winnipeg Hawks and the Vancouver Knights, finished in a tie. Winnipeg Hawks won the match in the Super Over, to win their first title.

Teams and squads
The following teams, squads and coaches were announced for the tournament. More than 1,000 cricketers from 42 nations were on the list for the players' draft.

In July 2019, Steven Taylor, Jasdeep Singh and Timil Patel withdrew from the tournament, after signing central contracts with USA Cricket. In early August, the majority of the Emirati cricketers were recalled to play in the Twenty20 International (T20I) series against the Netherlands. On 5 August 2019, Brendon McCullum announced his retirement from cricket, with the tournament being his final matches.

Points table
 

The top four teams qualified for the playoffs
 Advanced to Playoff 1
 Advanced to Knockout

League stage
The full fixtures were confirmed on 25 June 2019.

Round 1

Round 2

Playoffs

Final

References

External links
 Series home at ESPN Cricinfo

2019 in Canadian cricket
Canadian domestic cricket competitions
Global T20 Canada
Global T20 Canada seasons